Majeed Zuwair is a former Iraqi football defender who played for Iraq in the 1972 AFC Asian Cup. He played for the national team in 1972.

References

Living people
Iraqi footballers
Iraq international footballers
1972 AFC Asian Cup players
Association football defenders
Year of birth missing (living people)